Kenn Hansen (born 29 May 1980) is a Danish former football referee.

Hansen became a FIFA referee in 2011. He spent his career as a Danish Superliga referee from 2008.

Hansen retired from refereeing in 2015.

References 

1980 births
Living people
Danish football referees
UEFA Europa League referees